Factor X was the Portuguese version of the television music competition The X Factor, originally created by Simon Cowell. The first episode premiered on 6 October 2013 hosted by Bárbara Guimarães, João Manzarra, Carolina Torres and Tiago Silva. The three judges are Paulo Junqueiro, Sónia Tavares and Paulo Ventura.

Format

Stages
Stage 1: Producers' auditions – these auditions are un-televised, and decide who will sing in front of the judges
Stage 2: Judges' auditions – in an arena (series 1–3)
Stage 3: Bootcampo – either a series of challenges and knock out rounds and the seat challenge (series 1-3)
Stage 4: Judges' houses – either pre-recorded (series 1–3)
Stage 5: Live shows (1-3)

Series overview
To date, two seasons have been broadcast, as summarised below.

 Contestant in (or mentor of) "Boys" category
 Contestant in (or mentor of) "Girls" category
 Contestant in (or mentor of) "16–24s" category
 Contestant in (or mentor of) "Groups" category
 Contestant in (or mentor of) "Over 25s" category

Judges' categories and their contestants

In each season, each judge is allocated a category to mentor and chooses acts to progress to the live shows. This table shows, for each season, which category each judge was allocated and which acts he or she put through to the live shows.

Key:
 – Winning judge/category. Winners are in bold, eliminated contestants in small font.

Season 1

Contestants
The categories and top 15 acts were as follows:

Key:
 – Winner
 – Runner-up
 – Third place

Results summary

  – Contestant was in the bottom two

Notes:
1 Ventura was the only mentor able to vote due to contestants in final showdown are both from groups category.

Season 2

Contestants
The categories and top 16 acts were as follows:

Key:
 – Winner
 – Runner-up
 – Third place

Results summary
  – Contestant was in the bottom two or three
  – Contestant was in the bottom three but received the fewest votes and was immediately eliminated

Live shows

Week 1 (2 November 2014)

Week 2 (9 November 2014)

Week 3 (16 November 2014)

Week 4 (23 November 2014)

Week 5 (30 November 2014)

Week 6 (7 December 2014) 
Theme: Songs from The Beatles

Week 7 (14 December 2014)

Week 8 (21 December 2014)

Week 9 (28 December 2014)

Week 10 (31 December 2014)

Round 1

Final Round

References

External links
 Official Website 

Portugal
2010s Portuguese television series
2013 Portuguese television series debuts
2014 Portuguese television series endings
Portuguese music television series
Portuguese reality television series
Television series by Fremantle (company)
Sociedade Independente de Comunicação original programming
Portuguese television series based on British television series